Nove Mil Anjos (Portuguese for "Nine Thousand Angels"), also referred to as 9MA, was a short-lived Brazilian alternative rock band from São Paulo.

History
Nove Mil Anjos was conceived by Junior Lima in 2008, one year after the break-up of Sandy & Junior, the duo he was a part of alongside his sister Sandy which acquired massive success throughout the 1990s and the 2000s. Besides Lima, who was the drummer, the band also comprised guitarist Peu Sousa (previously a live musician for singer Pitty), bassist Champignon (of Charlie Brown Jr. and Revolucionnários) and vocalist Péricles "Perí" Carpigiani. The band's name, however, was suggested by Sousa, who claimed it came to him through a dream. Later that year they released their first single, "Chuva Agora", through their official Myspace page, and made their debut show at the MTV Video Music Brazil award ceremony in October.

In mid-October the band travelled to Los Angeles to work on their debut album, 9MA, alongside producer Sebastian Krys. It was released to mostly positive reviews.

By late 2009, creative divergences between the bandmembers led Lima to put the group on hold. Following the suicides of Sousa and Champignon in May and September 2013 respectively, any possibilities of a reunion ended.

Discography

Studio album

Singles

References

External links
 Nove Mil Anjos on Myspace

Musical groups established in 2008
Musical groups disestablished in 2009
Brazilian alternative rock groups
Brazilian indie rock groups
Funk rock musical groups
Brazilian pop rock music groups
Musical quartets
Musical groups from São Paulo
2008 establishments in Brazil
2009 disestablishments in Brazil